Spaceflight IC-1: An Adventure in Space is a 1965 British science-fiction movie starring Bill Williams and Norma West. The civilized world is controlled by an all-powerful computerized government that is carefully choosing colonists for its newest space launch. The candidates are selected on the basis of their age, health and IQ.

The director was Bernard Knowles and the writer was Harry Spalding working under the name "Henry Cross".

Plot summary
In the year 2015, spaceship IC-1 (Interstellar Colony #1) travels toward a planet similar to Earth to explore the possibility that the population problem on Earth can eventually be solved there. IC-1's crew consists of Capt. Mead Ralston (Bill Williams), his wife Jan (Norma West), Drs. Steven (John Cairney) and Helen Thomas (Linda Marlowe), two other married couples, and four people in suspended animation.  One year into the voyage, Helen is found to have a fatal pancreatic infection that can only be cured if the ship returns to Earth, but Captain Ralston refuses to turn back; and when he denies her permission to have another child, she commits suicide.

Steven and some of the other crew members mutiny and imprison Captain Ralston. When Capt. Ralston escapes, he forces the crew to obey him by threatening to destroy the ship. Ralston plans to execute Steven. Ignoring the warnings of the crew, he releases one of the "animates" by raising the temperature of the compartment in which it is suspended, and the "animate" kills him before dying of complications caused by the thawing out process. The ship goes on under Steven's leadership.

Cast
 Bill Williams as Capt. Mead Ralston 
 Norma West as Jan Ralston 
 John Cairney as Dr. Steven Thomas 
 Jeremy Longhurst as John Saunders, Chief Engineer 
 Donald Churchill as Carl Wolcott 
 Kathleen Breck as Kate Saunders 
 Margo McLennan as Joyce Wolcott (as Margo Mayne) 
 Linda Marlowe as Dr. Helen Thomas 
 John Lee as Dr. Garth 
 Andrew Downie as Capt. Burnett (Spacestation) 
 Mark Lester as Don Saunders 
 Stuart Middleton as Michael Thomas 
 Anthony Honour as Robert Wolcott 
 Tony Doonan as Dr. Griffith 
 Chuck Julian as Webster

Production
The film was shot in England at Shepperton Studios. It was one of several films that Robert L. Lippert made with Jack Parsons in England. Writer Harry Spalding says the film was inspired by space exploration at the time. "There was a lot of talk back then that if people were ever having to go to fly to Mars they'd have to be frozen for the trip and revived when they got there."

References

External links
 
 
 
 

1965 films
British space adventure films
1960s science fiction films
British science fiction films
20th Century Fox films
British black-and-white films
Films about astronauts
Films scored by Elisabeth Lutyens
Films set in the future
Films set in 2015
1960s English-language films
1960s British films